Juan Matheus Alano Nascimento commonly known as Juan Alano (born 2 September 1996), is a Brazilian professional footballer who plays as a winger for Gamba Osaka.

Club career

Internacional
Starting his career with Trieste Futebol Clube in his home state of Paraná, Alano spent his youth football career with Internacional, joining them in 2011 at U-15 level. Working his way through the various age groups, he impressed Internacional B team coach Ricardo Colbachini who described him as an intelligent player who is a quality passer.
He made his first-team debut in the now defunct Primeira Liga in 2017, appearing as a 71st minute substitute in a 3-1 win over Criciúma. He went on to make 15 appearances in his debut season for the club, the majority of those in the league and all of them coming from the bench. It wasn't until the 2018 season though until he was handed his first start, this coming in a 2-1 league win over Athletico Paranaense due to a suspension to teammate Edenílson.

Loan to Coritiba
After struggling to break into the first team at Internacional, on 30 January 2019 Alano was loaned out to Série B club Coritiba until the end of the year. He made 44 appearances across all competitions and helped them secure a third place finish in the league and promotion to Série A. During this season he scored his first professional goal, scoring in a 3-2 league defeat to Paraná.

Kashima Antlers
Despite a successful season with Coritiba, Alano was surplus to requirements at Internacional and on 16 December 2019, Alano was sold to Kashima Antlers for a fee of €1.4m. Kashima handed him the number 7 shirt. There he would join fellow countrymen Léo Silva and Everaldo and was coached by Antônio Carlos Zago. Alano made 33 appearances in all competitions in his debut Kashima season, employed mainly as a right midfielder. He made his debut in a 3-0 league defeat to Sanfrecce Hiroshima, and scored his first goal in a 2-1 win over FC Tokyo with a powerful left footed finish. He also made his first ever appearance in a continental competition, playing 90 minutes in a 1-0 defeat to Melbourne Victory in the 2020 AFC Champions League. Alano went on to play another 52 games for Kashima Antlers over the following two seasons, scoring a total of 9 goals for the club.

Gamba Osaka
In July 2022, it was announced that Alano would be joining fellow J.League club Gamba Osaka.

Club statistics
.

References

External links

1996 births
Living people
Brazilian footballers
Brazilian expatriate footballers
Association football midfielders
Sport Club Internacional players
Coritiba Foot Ball Club players
Kashima Antlers players
Gamba Osaka players
Campeonato Brasileiro Série A players
Campeonato Brasileiro Série B players
J1 League players
Brazilian expatriate sportspeople in Japan
Expatriate footballers in Japan
Footballers from Curitiba